Kalingapatty is a panchayat Village in Tenkasi district in the Indian state of Tamil Nadu.  This village is under the control of  Kuruvikulam block, Sankarankoil taluk

Notable personalities
 Vaiko, MDMK chief & member of Rajya Sabha since 2019 was born in this village

References

Next athippatti village in Veeranapuram

Tenkasi district